BAL-AMi Jukeboxes were manufactured in the UK from 1953 to 1962, by the Balfour (Marine) Engineering Company, mostly being derivatives of those made by the American AMi (Automatic Musical Instrument) jukebox company.

History

In the years following World War II, import restrictions were in place in the UK thus preventing many types of goods from being sold unless they had a certain percentage of locally manufactured content. One such example was the record playing jukebox, which were almost exclusively made in the United States at that time.

In order for any of these jukeboxes to be allowed to be sold in the UK, at least 53% of their content had to be manufactured locally. Recognising an opportunity, a London-based businessman, Sam Norman, engaged with John Haddock of the AMi jukebox corporation. An agreement was reached in 1953 for Norman's company, Balfour (Marine) Engineering, to manufacture AMi jukeboxes at the Balfour factory in Ilford, Essex, under licence from AMi.

During the following ten years Balfour produced jukeboxes which were mostly identical to their AMi counterparts, aside from their internal electrical systems and amplifiers. The electrics were to UK specifications, and the amplifiers were generally provided by Beam-Echo. From 1955 onwards, these jukeboxes were distributed under the name of BAL-AMi.

To address the needs of some smaller venues such as coffee bars, BAL-AMi also manufactured some machines unique to the UK and holding just twenty records (giving forty selections allowing for two sides per disc).

Models

End of Jukebox Production

Sam Norman died of leukaemia in 1962, at the age of 47. BAL-AMi made their final model, the New Yorker, that same year. The Balfour company continued operations in other areas such as aircraft parts for the rest of the 1960s.

References

External links
BAL-AMi Jukeboxes Home of the British-made BAL-AMi jukeboxes
Jukebox-Archive: BAL-AMI

Jukeboxes